Selberg may refer to:

People
 Arne Selberg (1910–1989), Norwegian engineer
 Atle Selberg (1917–2007), Norwegian mathematician, after whom several mathematical entities are named
 David Selberg (1995–2018), Swedish ice hockey player
 Henrik Selberg (1906–1993), Norwegian mathematician
 Knut Selberg (born 1949), Norwegian architect, and urban designer
 Ole Michael Ludvigsen Selberg (1877–1950), Norwegian mathematician
 Shannon Selberg (born 1960), American rock musician
 Sigmund Selberg (1910–1994), Norwegian mathematician
 Tim Selberg (born 1959), maker of mechanized figures for ventriloquism

Other uses
 Selberg (Kusel), a hill in the  Rhineland-Palatinate, Germany

See also

 Stary Żelibórz (formerly German: Sellberg), a village in West Pomeranian Voivodeship, Poland
 Sellenberg (disambiguation)

Norwegian-language surnames